David Pascoe Aiers,  (19 September 1922 – 5 July 1983) was a British diplomat.

Education
Aiers was educated at the Stationers' Company's School and Trinity College, Oxford.

Military service
Aiers was a captain in the Royal Artillery from 1942 to 1946.

Career
Aiers joined Her Majesty's Diplomatic Service in 1950. After another spell at the  FO he was First Secretary (Commercial) in Manila from 1958 to 1962; then Head of Chancery in Ankara from 1962 to 1965. He was Counsellor in Singapore from 1965 to 1968; Head of the SW Pacific Department at the FCO from 1968 to 1971; and then Minister at Canberra from 1971 to 1975. He was High Commissioner of the United Kingdom to Sri Lanka (and Ambassador of the United Kingdom to the Maldives from 1976 to 1979; and finally, and finally, High Commissioner to Malta from 1979 to 1982. His successor was Charles Leonard Booth.

References

High Commissioners of the United Kingdom to the Maldives
High Commissioners of the United Kingdom to Sri Lanka
High Commissioners of the United Kingdom to Malta
People educated at the Stationers' Company's School
Alumni of Trinity College, Oxford
Companions of the Order of St Michael and St George
1922 births
1983 deaths
British Army personnel of World War II
Royal Artillery officers
British expatriates in Poland
British expatriates in Denmark
British expatriates in Argentina
British expatriates in the Philippines
British expatriates in Turkey
British expatriates in Singapore